Ann Augustine (born Anate Augustine) is an Indian actress who appears in Malayalam films. She is the daughter of Malayalam actor Augustine. She made her debut in Lal Jose's Elsamma Enna Aankutty (2010).

Early life and education
Ann Augustine was born in Calicut to veteran actor Augustine and Hancy Augustine. Ann did her early part of school in Presentation Higher Secondary School in Calicut and later in Sacred Heart School. In 2010, she graduated in psychology from Kristu Jayanti College, Bengaluru. Later, she completed her post-graduation in Psychology from Jain University, Bengaluru.

Career
She started her acting career during her final year of graduation with Lal Jose's Elsamma Enna Aankutty where she played the titular role. The film was a commercial success and her performance was highly appreciated by critics. Her portrayal of 'Gayathri' in Artist garnered many accolades including the Kerala State Film Awards for Best Actress.

Personal life

Ann Augustine married cinematographer Jomon T. John on 2 February 2014. They are now divorced. She took a break from acting after her father's demise and resumed in 2015 with Nee-Na.

Awards

Kerala State Film Awards
 Kerala State Film Award for Best Actress (2013) : Artist

Filmfare Awards South
 61st Filmfare Awards South:
 Filmfare Award for Best Actress – Malayalam  : Artist

3rd South Indian International Movie Awards
 Critics Award: Artist

Filmography
 As an actress

 As Co-producer
TBA - Abbabba  - Kannada movie
 2023 - Enkilum Chandirke  - Malayalam movie

Television

References

External links
 

Living people
Year of birth missing (living people)
Actresses from Kozhikode
21st-century Indian actresses
Actresses in Malayalam cinema
Indian film actresses
Filmfare Awards South winners
Kerala State Film Award winners